The canton of L'Isle-d'Abeau is an administrative division of the Isère department, eastern France. Its borders were modified at the French canton reorganisation which came into effect in March 2015. Its seat is in L'Isle-d'Abeau.

It consists of the following communes:
 
Chèzeneuve
Crachier
Culin
Four
L'Isle-d'Abeau
Maubec
Meyrieu-les-Étangs
Saint-Agnin-sur-Bion
Saint-Alban-de-Roche
Saint-Jean-de-Bournay
Tramolé
Vaulx-Milieu
Villefontaine

References

Cantons of Isère